Carros de cesto do Monte (from pt. basket carts from Monte), known as Monte Toboggan – means of transportation from Monte in Funchal, the capital of Portuguese island Madeira. It consists of carts that are wicker baskets mounted on skids, sometimes compared to toboggan. They are pushed by men called Carreiros. Currently, they are a tourist attraction.

History 
The carts were invented in 1850, when the inhabitants of what was then the village of Monte, wanted to travel quickly to Funchal below. Currently, they are one of the biggest tourist attractions of Madeira. The route is about 2 kilometers long and runs through the streets of the city. The vehicle reaches a speed of approximately 38 km/h and arrives at the bottom station in about 10 minutes. The carts are driven by men called Carreiros, dressed in white and wearing straw hats (boaters). They also use rubber-soled shoes that allow them to brake the carts.

Notes

References

External links 

 Carreiros do Monte website.
 Madeira Promotion Office website.

Vehicles
Funchal
Tourism in Portugal
Transport in Portugal
Road transport